Golunda is a genus of murine rodent.

Fossil record
The Indian bush rat (Golunda ellioti) is the sole surviving member of this genus, but it was formerly more diverse and widespread, occurring in both Asia and Africa. The last surviving species in Africa was Golunda aouraghei from the Early Pleistocene. The genus was thought to have originated in Africa, with the Pliocene-aged G. gurai thought to be ancestral to all other species, but it is now thought that the genus originated in India with the species G. tatroticus, also from the Pliocene.

References

Taxa named by John Edward Gray
Rodent genera
Mammal genera with one living species
Muridae